Palmitos Park is a  botanical garden, aviary and zoo on the island of Gran Canaria, Canary Islands, Spain.

Geography & climate
The park has a humid subtropical climate.

Layout
There is a terrace near a fountain, along a path that leads up to the amphitheater where flying birds of prey perform in shows. Next to the amphitheater there is a snack bar, and a small cafe can be found in the park.

One feature of the park is the great wealth of cacti and succulents. There are over 160 different cactus types, and 1000 palm trees of 42 different types.

Parrot-like birds are well represented in the park, but other types of birds can also be found, including swans and ducks. Overall, there are over 1,500 exotic birds of 230 different species. Many fly freely around the park.

Palmitos Park holds Europe's largest butterfly venue, as well as the biggest Orchid collection on the island.

Near the exit - behind the souvenir shop, one can admire hummingbirds that fly very visibly in front of their food.

Sections of the park
Butterfly house with (mainly living) butterflies.
Pond with water birds
Dolphinarium with 6 dolphins, and live dolphin shows interacting with the audience.
Dolphin Photo Opportunity where members of the public can have their photo taken while stroking a dolphin (additional fee)
Swim with Dolphins opportunity (additional fee)
Glass cages with hummingbirds
House of orchids
Terrace near fountain
Amphitheater with shows with flying birds of prey
Presentation room with documentaries and shows with trained parrots
Souvenir shop
Aquaria with many kinds of fish and other underwater animals

Gallery

2007 Gran Canaria forest fires
On July 31, 2007 it was reported in the media that almost 65% of the park was burned due to ten forest fires, and that some exotic bird species - such as the toucan - may have been killed. The forest fires caused evacuations of certain parts of Gran Canaria and Tenerife. A local Forest Ranger was accused of starting the fires intentionally in order to keep him in employment as his contract was due to expire.

Over 2000 people from the village of Mogán were evacuated, as well as El Salobre. No human people died during the fire, but many houses were burned to the ground. Smoke was clearly visible from space.

Because Palmitos Park was severely affected by the fire, it was closed for a whole year. The park opened for the public again August 4, 2008. It has a new section with information about the forest fire.

Notes

External links

Gran Canaria
Aviaries
Botanical gardens in the Canary Islands
Tourist attractions in the Canary Islands
Zoos in Spain
Aspro Parks attractions